A discontinuous group is a mathematical concept relating to mappings in topological space.

Definition

References

Topological spaces
Topological groups